Sarita Chaudhary (born 1975) is a former mayor of South Delhi Municipal Corporation and a leader of Bharatiya Janata Party.

She studied B.ed and LLB from Maharishi Dayanand University.

References

1975 births
Mayors of South Delhi
Living people
Bharatiya Janata Party politicians from Delhi
People from South Delhi district
Women mayors of places in Delhi
21st-century Indian women politicians
21st-century Indian politicians